The American 7s Football League (A7FL) is a professional league in the United States which plays a seven-man version of gridiron football called American 7s Football. Launched in 2015, its games are played without football helmets or other protective equipment. The A7FL is the only organized level of competition in American 7s football.

History
Founded in 2014 with play commencing the following year, the A7FL plays an eight-game schedule running from March to June. It primarily attracts semi-professional football players seeking opportunities to stay in shape during spring.  In 2016, the league participated in a safety study led by the New Jersey Institute of Technology.

Differences from other leagues
A7FL players play without pads or helmets as part of what the league describes as an effort to reduce the potential of head injuries resulting from helmet-to-helmet contact. League games also do not include kickoffs, field goals, or punts, and, instead of the kickoff, implement a unique version of special teams called a 3-on-1 throw off (three 'throwing' players and one receiver). Games are played on narrow fields of 37 yards' width (34 m, between one set of hash marks and the furthest sideline away) to accommodate fewer players on the field on each team. A7FL games are played between two seven-man teams; teams are, additionally, required to cap their rosters at 35 active players.

Teams

Teams that participated in the 2022 season.

Media coverage

Eleven Sports Network acquired the exclusive United States and international rights to broadcast the A7FL 2017 Championship on July 9, 2017, played at Palisades Credit Union Park. Through Eleven Sports Network's distribution with DirecTV, Verizon FiOS, and AT&T uVerse the A7FL 2017 Championship was to be accessible by over 70 million homes worldwide. In 2018, Eleven Sports Network acquired the exclusive United States and international rights to broadcast a 21-game package including the playoffs and championship, and in 2019, the non-exclusive U.S. and international rights to the playoffs and championship.

In 2019, Twitch acquired the exclusive United States and international rights to a 21-game package of the season including the playoffs and championship. In 2020, A7FL again partnered with Eleven Sports Network for the exclusive United States and international rights of the season, including the playoffs and championship.  For 2021, FITE TV acquired the United States and international rights to the A7FL's season including the playoffs and championship. In 2022, select Games of the Week -- including the playoffs and championship - were broadcast on Stadium (sports network), as well as YouTube.

Organization
The CEO of the A7FL is Sener Korkusuz and its president is Ryan DePaul.

In 2019, UFC co-founder David Isaacs joined the A7FL to serve as chairman of the advisory board. Isaacs said, "Removing equipment to make any sport safer seems counterintuitive and we faced similar issues when we launched the UFC and created the sport of mixed martial arts. With the A7FL, football can be safer but still thrilling full-contact competition. I can't wait to get started."

Athletes playing in the A7FL are required to sign a player injury waiver and be 18 years of age or older.

Once expanded to 32 teams, the league will be structured around eight groups divided into two conferences – the east and west.  The teams play each other twice – in the regional stages during the regular season – with the top two teams going forward to a divisional championship.  The winners of the divisional championships will play each other to decide the winner of the championship.

See also
 Rugby sevens

References

American football leagues in the United States
Sports leagues established in 2015
2015 establishments in the United States